Sébastien Chabbert (born 15 May 1978 in Pau) is a retired French footballer who played as a goalkeeper.

Honours
Lens
UEFA Intertoto Cup: 2005

References

1978 births
Living people
French footballers
Ligue 1 players
Ligue 2 players
AS Cannes players
FC Metz players
RC Lens players
Amiens SC players
Association football goalkeepers
AS Monaco FC players
Belgian Pro League players
R. Charleroi S.C. players